Terry on the Fence is a 1985 British drama film directed by Frank Godwin and starring Jack McNicholl, Neville Watson, Tracey Ann-Morris, and Susan Jameson.

It cost £180,747.

Premise
A young tearaway becomes involved with a gang of criminals.

Cast
Jack McNicholl: Terry
Neville Watson: Les
Tracey Ann-Morris: Tracey
Jeff Ward: Mick
Matthew Barker: Denis
Brian Coyle: Plastic-Head
Susan Jameson: Terry's Mum
Martin Fisk: Terry's Dad
Margery Mason: Terry's Gran
Helen Keating: Mrs. Hicks
Jon Croft: Headmaster
Clifford Rose: Magistrate
Ann Morrish: Lady Magistrate
Julian Curry: Clerk of the Court
Tim Preece: Schoolmaster
Janet Davies: Usher

References

External links

Children's Film Foundation
1985 drama films
1985 films
British drama films
1980s English-language films
1980s British films